"Perfect Day" is a song by American hip hop recording artist Jim Jones released as the lead single from his fifth studio album Capo. The song features American rappers-producers Chink Santana and Lamont "LOGiC" Coleman, the latter of whom also happened to produce the record. The song was released as a digital download on December 7, 2010. The song is a notable departure from Jones' traditional style of rap, and instead features him singing—similar to likes of pop-rap contemporaries Wiz Khalifa and Kid Cudi.

Background 
In an interview with Artistdirect, when asked what's the story behind "Perfect Day?" What does that song mean to you? Jones responded

Music video 
Directed by Zeus Morand and Jim Jones the video was released on Jim Jones VEVO on March 18, 2011. The video is set in various places including a hospital and features sign language for the hearing impaired. Jones' motivation for the innovative music video came from someone close to him: The mother of one of his close friends is deaf. "She asked, 'Why don't people in the music industry ever have people doing sign language in their videos because they love music, too?' They can feel the beat like anybody else," Jones told the Daily News in an interview at Empire Studio in the Flatiron District. Jones decided "Perfect Day" would be the ideal song to incorporate sign language - and he wanted to learn it as well. Jones dedicated the video to cancer patients or anyone affected by cancer, and to the soldiers at war right now.

Charts

Release Information

Purchasable Release

References

2010 singles
Jim Jones (rapper) songs
2010 songs
Songs written by Jim Jones (rapper)
Songs written by Chink Santana